Lepidosperma neesii is a grass-like plant found in south eastern Australia. Usually seen in heath and woodland on moist sites, it may grow to 80 centimetres tall.  The specific epithet neesii honours the botanist Christian Gottfried Daniel Nees von Esenbeck.

References

neesii
Flora of New South Wales
Flora of Victoria (Australia)
Poales of Australia
Plants described in 1837